Valvata studeri is a species of minute freshwater snail with an operculum, an aquatic gastropod mollusk in the family Valvatidae, the valve snails.

Distribution and conservation status
This species occurs in:
 Germany - critically endangered (vom Aussterben bedroht)

References

External links 
 Valvata studeri at AnimalBase

Valvatidae
Gastropods described in 1998
Molluscs of Europe